The Quishuar Lakes (possibly from ) are a group of lakes in the La Libertad Region in Peru.

See also
List of lakes in Peru

References
INEI, Compendio Estadistica 2007, page 26

Lakes of Peru
Lakes of La Libertad Region